Kannur City Police (KCPD) (Malayalam: കണ്ണൂർ സിറ്റി പോലീസ്), a division of the Kerala Police, is the law enforcement agency for the city of Kannur, Thalassery and Kuthuparamba. The Kannur city police force is headed by District Police Chief, also known as Commissioner of Police and the administrative control vests with the Home Department of Kerala.

The Kannur City Police District came into existence vide GO(MS)No.32/2011 dated 05/02/2011, on 3/March/2011. After the bifrication, erstwhile Kannur District Police has been divided into Kannur city and Kannur Rural. There are 3 Subdivisions and 24 Police stations in Kannur City Police District.

Police stations under Kannur City
Kannur City Police district have jurisdiction over 22 police stations and 2 police control rooms.  Kannur and Thalassery sub-divisions consist of eight police stations and one control rooms each and Kuthuparamba sub-division has six police stations under its jurisdiction limits.

Kannur Sub-division
 Kannur Town 
 Kannur Traffic PS 
 Kannur City
 Edakkad
 Chakkarakal 
 Valapattanam 
 Kannapuram
 Mayyil

Thalassery Sub-division
 Thalassery 
 Thalassery Traffic PS
 Thalassery Coastal PS
 Dharmadom
 New Mahe
 Chockli
 Kathirur
 Pinarayi

Kuthuparamba Sub-division
 Kuthuparamba
 Mattanur
 Mattanur Airport
 Kolavelloor
 Panoor
 Kannavam

References

Kerala Police